Political music in China (政治歌曲) consists of Patriotic Music (爱国歌曲) and Revolutionary Music (革命歌曲).  It is an ideological music with political or nationalistic content, sometimes taking the form of a modernized Chinese traditional music written or adapted for some form of grand presentation with an orchestra.  It was created in the early to mid-20th century, become the dominant genre of music after the Communist victory in China, and until the 1980s was the main form of music broadcast on radio and television in China.

Characteristics
Political music may be practically viewed at the political and ideology level. There are basically two ends of the spectrum.

The light end is the typical "Patriotic Music". It is usually performed by some collection of instrument or orchestra. It is equivalent to national anthems performed in other countries, perhaps taken more seriously by the Chinese government.

The extreme end is termed "Revolutionary Music". There is often a political or Maoist agenda behind it, and some may classify it as "Propaganda Music".

History

Origin
After the fall of the Qing Dynasty, the New Culture Movement was initiated to promote a new national culture, including a new national music guoyue, and greater patriotism. Identity and national pride became important during the Second Sino-Japanese War and the Chinese Civil War throughout the 1930s. A left-wing music movement to promote music with anti-Imperialist and anti-feudal content called New Music (新音乐) began in the 1930s.

Birth of Revolutionary songs (1949–1970s)
In 1949 the Kuomintang relocated to Taiwan, and the People's Republic of China was established. The Communist Party would promote revolutionary music while suppressing traditional music and Chinese popular music.

The songs were presented differently from the usual national anthems, since the government made a genuine effort to upgrade the music for a political cause. An example is Lin Biao in 1964 promoting that "all Chinese were urged to learn from the People's Liberation Army", who were taught 11 revolutionary songs. For the musicians of the era, they were expected to model their work after the army's musical organization The Communist movements and propaganda during the 1960s and 1970s was successful enough that people listened to revolutionary music as a main genre. The national anthem of March of the Volunteers was suspended in favor of The East Is Red during the cultural revolution.

Revolutionary opera (1960s-1970s)

Jiang Qing was the main advocate of the revolutionary opera, and during the cultural revolution, only certain approved work could be performed.

Mao nostalgia period (1990s)
As recent as 1991, anthems to Mao Zedong were updated into disco-like arrangements released in Shanghai by the China Record Company. The album titled "The Red Sun" (紅太陽) became an instant best seller. For nostalgia, social, patriotic or entertainment purposes, there are many reasons why the genre have leaned so close to commercial music in the past. A lot has to do with the Communist censorship imposed in other genres, giving the people less choice.

Style

Patriotic Songs
Ensembles performing patriotic political songs range from chamber groups to quite large orchestras or a concert band which are led by a conductor. Orchestral patriotic music compositions are often arranged in concerto-like form, for solo instrument and orchestra, and often incorporate some use of Western harmony.

Usually it combines traditional instruments with western ones. Like in The East is Red, melodies of traditional instruments like erhu and sheng are combined with western ones such as violin and trumpets.

Revolutionary songs
Any given patriotic song can be performed for a revolutionary cause. Sometimes compositions are done to reflect a legacy. An example is compositions by Zhang Guangtian's (张广天) in 1993 idolizing the Cultural Revolution. The lyrics did get censored by the government to some degree for being too extreme, demonstrating how far the lyrics can go.

See also
 Cultural Revolution
 Guoyue
 Musical nationalism
 Historical Chinese anthems

References

20th-century music genres
Chinese styles of music
Political music genres